St. Peter Stiftskulinarium (until 2017 Stiftskeller St. Peter) is a restaurant within the walls of St Peter's Abbey in Salzburg, Austria. It is speculated to have been operating since before AD 803, which would make it the oldest inn in Central Europe, and the oldest restaurant in the world.

Likely age
The claims of the Stiftskeller's age are based on the writings of English scholar Alcuin of York, who served Emperor Charlemagne and Bishop Arno of Salzburg. In his Carmina anthology, issued in 803, the monastery's cellar and its beer are possibly praised in a poem. The former guesthouse of the Benedictine monks was also mentioned by the Monk of Salzburg in the 14th century.

Based on these and other claims, the Stiftskulinarium is perhaps the oldest existing restaurant in the world, and likely the oldest in Europe. Christopher Columbus, Johann Georg Faust, and Wolfgang Amadeus Mozart are said to have been served at the restaurant.

See also
 List of oldest companies

References

External links

 Restaurant website
 Carmen CXI, the cited poem

Restaurants in Austria
Buildings and structures in Salzburg
Austrian brands
Buildings and structures completed in 803